Krasnohvardiiske Raion, known by Ukrainian authorities as Kurman Rayon is one of the 25 regions of the Autonomous Republic of Crimea, a territory recognised by a majority of countries as part of Ukraine and annexed by Russia. The administrative centre of the raion is the urban-type settlement of Krasnohvardiiske. Krasnohvardiiske Raion is located in the central part of Crimea. Population:

Notes

References

Raions of Crimea